Fascilunaria is a genus of moths in the family Geometridae. It consists of only one species, Fascilunaria cyphoschema, which is found in south-western China, northern Vietnam and Burma.

References

Cidariini
Monotypic moth genera